Ramajendas is a genus of water bear or moss piglet, a tardigrade in the class Eutardigrada.

Species
 Ramajendas frigidus Pilato and Binda, 1991
 Ramajendas heatwolei Miller, Horning and Dastych, 1995
 Ramajendas renaudi (Ramazzotti, 1972)

References

External links

Parachaela
Tardigrade genera
Xerophiles